Nova Lituania is a 2019 Lithuanian drama film directed by Karolis Kaupinis. It was selected as the Lithuanian entry for the Best International Feature Film at the 93rd Academy Awards, but it was not nominated. The film was inspired by a real-life Lithuanian interwar political theorist Kazys Pakštas and his works on Dausuva.

Synopsis
A geographer comes up with a plan to start an overseas colony before the outbreak of World War II.

Cast
 Aleksas Kazanavičius as Feliksas
 Vaidotas Martinaitis as Premjeras
 Valentinas Masalskis as Prezidentas
 Rasa Samuolytė as Veronika
 Eglė Gabrėnaitė as Kotryna

See also
 List of submissions to the 93rd Academy Awards for Best International Feature Film
 List of Lithuanian submissions for the Academy Award for Best International Feature Film

References

External links
 

2019 films
2019 drama films
Lithuanian drama films
Lithuanian-language films